Penghu County is represented in the Legislative Yuan since 2008 by one at-large single-member constituency (Penghu County Constituency).

Current district
 Penghu County

Legislators

Election results

2020

2016

References 

Constituencies in Taiwan
Penghu County